Jouvea is a Latin American genus of coastal plants in the grass family. It grows on mud flats and coastal sand dunes from northern Mexico to Ecuador.

Jouvea's closest relative in the subfamily Chloridoideae is likely Monanthochloe; both share the characteristic of distichously arranged leaves, and both are dioecious.

Jouvea was named for the French botanist Joseph Duval-Jouve (1810–1883)

 Species
 Jouvea pilosa (J.Presl) Scribn. - Central America (Guatemala to Nicaragua), Mexico (Tamaulipas, Baja California Sur, Sonora, Sinaloa, Jalisco, Nayarit, Guerrero, Michoacán, Colima, Oaxaca, Chiapas, Yucatán)
 Jouvea straminea E.Fourn. - Ecuador, Colombia, Central America (Guatemala to Panamá), Mexico (Socorro Island, Chiapas, Oaxaca, Michoacán, Guerrero, Jalisco, Sinaloa, Nayarit)

References

External links
 Photos of Jouvea pilosa, from San Diego State University.

Chloridoideae
Poaceae genera
Dioecious plants